Vernon Taylor (born November 9, 1937) is an American rockabilly musician.

Personal life
Vernon Taylor was born Walton Alderton on November 9th, 1937 into a Baptist family.  
He was the youngest of four children and at age 11 his family moved to Spencerville, Maryland where learned to play the guitar. 

At the age of fifteen he formed his first band (The Nighthawks) with two high school classmates and by 1956 they were a five- piece band called The Nighthawks.

Career 
The band received their first break while in high school, playing between sets for Curley Smith, who was later a member of the rock band Boston.  The Nighthawks went on to perform in an hour-long Saturday night TV show on WTTG channel 5 out of Washington, D.C from 1957-1960. During this time Taylor signed to Dot Records in 1957.
After releasing two singles, "Losing Game"/ "I've Got the Blues" (Dot 15632) and "Why Must You Leave Me" which did not sell either Dot Records cancelled his contract.

Taylor then signed with Sun Records after Sam Phillips.had seen him perform on American Bandstand. On October 27, 1958 Vernon recorded the single "Today Is A Blue Day"/"Breeze" (Sun 310) The second Sun single (325) was released on August 15, 1959 and after neither song was successful Taylor ended his music career, dedicating himself to his family and a career in business. 

In 1989 Taylor returned to music playing at a benefit concert for Charlie Feathers, which led to a comeback career. He has since performed in the United Kingdom and had a re-release of his Sun and Dot material on Germany's Eagle Records.   In 1999, Run Wild Records released a 12-song CD of newly-recorded material by Vernon, titled "Daddy's Rockin'".

Discography

References

External links
Vernon Taylor at the Rockabilly Hall of Fame

American musicians
American rockabilly musicians
1937 births
Living people